New political thinking (or simply new thinking) was the doctrine put forth by Mikhail Gorbachev as part of his reforms of the Soviet Union. Its major elements were ideologization of international politics, abandoning the concept of class struggle, priority of universal human interests over the interests of any class, increasing interdependence of the world, and mutual security based on political rather than military instruments, which constituted a significant shift from the previous principles of the Soviet foreign politics.

History 
In 1987 Gorbachev published the book Perestroika and New Political Thinking and in  December 1988 he presented the doctrine of new thinking in his speech to the United Nations.

The "new thinking" was of vital necessity for the Soviet Union to shut down the costly Cold War competition in order to continue the internal economic reforms of perestroika. 

Notable steps in this direction included the Intermediate-Range Nuclear Forces Treaty, Soviet withdrawal from Afghanistan, end of support of communist movements around the world and loosened the Soviet grip over Eastern Europe by replacing the Brezhnev Doctrine with the Sinatra Doctrine.

In 1990 Gorbachev was awarded the Nobel Prize for Peace "for his leading role in the peace process". 

The overall effect of these developments was the end of the Cold War and the breakdown of the Soviet Empire and ultimately of the Soviet Union itself.

See also
Mikhail Gorbachev: Foreign engagements

References
 
Ideology of the Communist Party of the Soviet Union
Mikhail Gorbachev
Perestroika
Politics of the Soviet Union
Reform in the Soviet Union